This is a list of currently active treaties that the Government of Australia has entered into since the federation of Australia in 1901. The Australian Department of Foreign Affairs and Trade, in conjunction with the Australasian Legal Information Institute, has published an online Australian Treaties Database from where this list is obtained and updated.

Treaties with Indigenous peoples of Australia

No substantial treaty has been entered into between the government of Australia and the Indigenous people of Australia. Some prior treaties exist in pockets, such as Batman's Treaty, but these are not substantial government treaties, i.e. treaties between the Government of the day and the traditional custodians of the land.

International bilateral treaties

Bilateral treaties on extradition and criminal matters
 List of Australian bilateral treaties on extradition and criminal matters

Bilateral treaties on postal services and money orders
 List of Australian bilateral treaties on postal services and money orders

Bilateral treaties on commerce, trade and arbitration
 List of Australian bilateral treaties on commerce, trade and arbitration

Bilateral treaties on intellectual property
 List of Australian bilateral treaties on intellectual property

Bilateral treaties by country

Multilateral treaties

List of Australian multilateral treaties

References

External links
Primary source of information, and further reading:
 Australian Treaties Library, Australasian Legal Information Institute
 DFAT – Treaty making process

 
Australia